Behind Closed Doors may refer to:

Film, television and radio

Film
 Behind Closed Doors (1929 film), an early talkie  starring Virginia Valli
 Behind Closed Doors (1961 film), an Italian film starring Anita Ekberg
 Behind Closed Doors (2003 film), a UK television film
 Behind Closed Doors (2008 film) or The Poker House, an American film by Lori Petty
 Behind Closed Doors (2014 film), a Moroccan film
Behind Closed Doors (2017 film), a documentary shown at the 67th Berlin International Film Festival

Television and radio
 Behind Closed Doors (1958 TV series), a 1958–1959 American spy docudrama TV series starring Bruce Gordon
 Behind Closed Doors (1996 TV series), an American documentary series
 Jean-Claude Van Damme: Behind Closed Doors, a 2011 UK reality TV show
 Behind Closed Doors, a Singaporean programme broadcast by MediaCorp Channel 5
Behind Closed Doors with Natalie Morales, a program produced by Reelz
 Behind Closed Doors, a series of live music performances recorded for the Dutch multimedia platform 3VOOR12
 "Behind Closed Doors" (King of the Hill), an episode of the TV animated sitcom
 "Behind Closed Doors" (Mayday), a television episode about an aircraft crash

Music

Albums
 Behind Closed Doors (Charlie Rich album) or the title song (see below), 1973
Behind Closed Doors (Secret Affair album), 1980
 Behind Closed Doors (Maria Solheim album) or the title song, 2002
 Behind Closed Doors (Thunder album), 1995
 Behind Closed Doors, an unreleased album by Olivia
 Behind Closed Doors (video), a video album by Reece Mastin, 2012

Songs
 "Behind Closed Doors" (Charlie Rich song), 1973
 "Behind Closed Doors" (Matt Fishel song), 2012
 "Behind Closed Doors" (Peter Andre song), 2009
 "Behind Closed Doors" (Pop Evil song), 2013
 "Behind Closed Doors", by Fishbone from Still Stuck in Your Throat
 "Behind Closed Doors", by Grandmaster Flash and the Furious Five from The Source
 "Behind Closed Doors", by New Order, B-side of the single "Crystal"
 "Behind Closed Doors", by Pharoahe Monch from Internal Affairs
 "Behind Closed Doors", by Rise Against from The Sufferer & the Witness

Literature
 Behind Closed Doors, a 2016 psychological thriller novel by B.A. Paris 
 Behind Closed Doors (play) or No Exit, a 1944 play by Jean-Paul Sartre
 Behind Closed Doors, a 1994 erotic novel by Alina Reyes
 Behind Closed Doors, an autobiography by Ngaire Thomas
 Behind Closed Doors: At Home in Georgian England, a 2009 book by Amanda Vickery
 Behind Closed Doors, a novel in the Sweet Valley University series by Francine Pascal

Other uses
 Behind closed doors (sport), sporting events played where spectators are not allowed to watch
 Behind Closed Doors, a 1988 escape the room text-adventure computer game

See also